Nikolay Davydenko was the defending champion, but lost in the second round this year.

David Nalbandian won the title, defeating Andrei Pavel 6–4, 6–1 in the final.

Seeds

  David Nalbandian (champion)
  Nikolay Davydenko (second round)
  Mario Ančić (second round)
  Tommy Haas (semifinals)
  Andrei Pavel (final)
  Igor Andreev (second round)
  Paradorn Srichaphan (second round)
  Rainer Schüttler (first round)

Draw

Finals

Top half

Bottom half

External links
 Main draw
 Qualifying draw

Singles